John Ernest Cook (11 October 1918 – 12 August 1984) was an Anglo-American organist, composer and church musician.

Early life, education and early career
John Cook was born at Maldon, Essex on 11 October 1918. After leaving St. John's School, Leatherhead, he entered Christ's College, Cambridge as an organ scholar where he came under the influence of Hugh Allen and Boris Ord. A conscientious objector to the second World War, he left his Cambridge studies prematurely to drive an ambulance during the Blitz of London.

Following the War, Cook spent three years at The Old Vic Theatre in London as an assistant to Herbert Menges.  He also worked as a copyist for Ralph Vaughan Williams on the score of the 1948 film Scott of the Antarctic and with Benjamin Britten on his chamber opera Albert Herring.

Later career 

In 1949 Cook was appointed as Organist and Choirmaster at Church of the Holy Trinity, Stratford-upon-Avon where he served for five years before accepting a similar post at St. Paul's Cathedral in London, Ontario.  It was during this time that he joined the teaching faculty of the University of Western Ontario and commenced his nine-year association with the Stratford Festival as resident conductor and composer.

Cook left Ontario in 1962 to claim the coveted post of Organist and Choirmaster at Church of the Advent in Boston—a landmark Episcopal church in the Anglo-Catholic tradition. Having established himself as a gifted organist, conductor and composer, he joined the faculties of the Longy School of Music in Cambridge and the Massachusetts Institute of Technology (MIT).

Illness and death 

Having battled with diabetes for two decades, Cook died on 12 August 1984.  A tribute concert was held at the Church of the Advent on 19 October that year and featured a chorus of his friends led by choirmaster James Busby and organists Marian Ruhl Metson and Barrie Cabena.

Compositions

Organ
Improvisation on Veni Creator Spiritus (1956)
Invocation and Allegro Giojoso (1956)
Paean on 'Divinum Mysterium' (1956)
Five Studies in Form of a Sonata (1955) (dedicated to Healey Willan)

Fantasy on A Scottish Psalm Tune, Martyrs. (1966)
Variations on Alles ist an Gottes Segen (1967)
Scherzo, Dance and Reflection (1965)
Flourish and Fugue (1962)
Mr. Purcell's Wedding March (1959) (Originally published as 'Hornpipe')
Passacharlia (1963, 1980) (Originally published as 'Passacaglia')
Concerto for Organ and Strings
Chaconne in D minor (arr.) (1955)
Chaconne from "King Arthur" (arr.) (1953)

Choral
Magnificat & Nunc Dimittis in D Major (1963)
Author of Light (1960)
Te Deum Laudamus (1965)
Missa Brevis in D (1963)
Fear No More the Heat O' the Sun
Christ Is Our Cornerstone
Morning Canticles
O God, The King of Glory: Anthem for Ascensiontide
A Short Mass for Men's Voices (MS) (1963)
Te Deum Laudamus and Jubilate in G Major (1952)

Other
Three Carols for Soprano
Toccata for Organ and Brass
Incidental music for The Prime of Miss Jean Brodie (Broadway)
Orchestration of The Green Table for Ballets Jooss.

Selected recordings
Organ Music of John Cook – Raven OAR-150
Cook N' Bacon – Raven OAR-210

References

External links
Technique for Choirs by John Cook Published by the Royal Canadian College of Organists (1960)

English organists
British male organists
People educated at St John's School, Leatherhead
Academic staff of the University of Western Ontario
Longy School of Music of Bard College faculty
MIT School of Humanities, Arts, and Social Sciences faculty
Deaths from diabetes
People from Maldon, Essex
1918 births
1984 deaths
Alumni of Christ's College, Cambridge
20th-century classical musicians
20th-century English composers
20th-century organists
20th-century British male musicians
English conscientious objectors